Mitty may refer to:

Archbishop Mitty High School, a high school in San Jose, California
John Joseph Mitty, fourth Archbishop of the Roman Catholic Archdiocese of San Francisco
Walter Mitty, a fictional character in:
James Thurber's 1941 short story "The Secret Life of Walter Mitty"
The Secret Life of Walter Mitty, a 1947 comedy film, loosely based on the short story 
The Secret Life of Walter Mitty, a 2013 remake 
Joe Mitty, a British salesman and founder of the first Oxfam charity shop in the United Kingdom in 1949
Buck Mitty, known as Humbug (comics), a fictional character appearing in the Marvel Comics universe, who was the senior entomology professor at ESU.
Mitty, Guinea
A nickname